St. Rose (of Lima) Church, also known as St. Rosa Church, is a Roman Catholic church located in Cincinnati, Ohio's  East End neighborhood at 2501 Riverside Drive (formerly Eastern Avenue). Located near the banks of the Ohio River, the church has endured many floods as evidenced by a high water mark painted on the rear side.

History
The congregation organized January 15, 1867. The parish was named for St. Rose of Lima, the first saint from the Americas. The parent parishes were Saint Philomena and St. Francis de Sales. The congregation was mostly German.

The church was erected in 1867; the cornerstone was laid October 6, 1867. The dedication occurred May 21, 1869. The cost, including lot, was over $60,000.

On January 31, 1894, the church and the school were almost entirely destroyed by fire — with only the walls remaining. The church was rebuilt at a cost of $30,000; every dollar was donated. The congregation numbered 200 families in 1896.

The parish remains active today.

References

External links
 Parish Profile
 Documentation from the University of Cincinnati
  A hand-painted gauge on the wall of St. Rose Church on Eastern Avenue shows the Ohio River level in 1997
 Postcard St. Rose Church, Cincinnati
 St. Rose Church, School & Parish House
 St. Rose Church, circa 1896 
 St. Rose & the Ohio River
 Rev. Joseph A. Meyer, Pastor, From the Souvenir Album of American cities: Catholic Churches of Cincinnati, circa 1896

National Register of Historic Places in Cincinnati
German-American history
Religious organizations established in 1867
Roman Catholic churches completed in 1869
19th-century Roman Catholic church buildings in the United States
1867 establishments in Ohio
Roman Catholic churches in Cincinnati